Veilleux is a surname. Notable people with the surname include:

André Veilleux, Canadian ice hockey player
David Veilleux (born 1987), Canadian cyclist
Éric Veilleux (born 1972), Canadian ice hockey player
Gérard Veilleux (born 1942), Canadian civil servant
Stéphane Veilleux (ice hockey) (born 1981), Canadian ice hockey player